Anjasmara Prasetya is an Indonesian actor. Anjasmara began his career as a model and then starred in the soap opera Romi and July with his then-wife Dian Nitami.

Personal life
Anjasmara Prasetya or Anjasmara, was born in Blitar, East Java on 13 November 1975, and began his career as a model.

Prasetya came to know his wife, Dian Nitami, during modelling and soap opera activities, Anjas formally proposed to Dian on 17 June 1999. The couple have two children, Sasikirana and Arka Setya Andipa Asmar. They also have adopted two children, Amanda Annette Syariff and Luther Aldi Syariff.

As a superstar, Anjasmara faced big problems when his picture, taken for an exhibition event, gained criticism of religious mass organizations. Photos featuring nude pictures of Anjasmara with photo model Isabel Yahya were considered pornographic.

After Anjasmara was examined at the police department, he admitted regret for what he did. The religious mass organizations withdrew demands originally aimed at Anjas afterwards.

Career
He was the finalist cover boy in one teenager magazine. After that he became involved in fashion modeling. He was first seen on national television playing in "Hati Seluas Samudra" with Elma Theana and Jeremy Thomas. 
He starred in the soap opera Romi and Juli with his future wife, Dian Nitami. His role as a stupid and funny man in the soap opera Si Cecep resulted in him winning the SCTV Award, Most Popular Actor category.

Anjas played as a father in the movie Joshua, Oh, Joshua that was produced in 2000. Afterwards, Anjas starred in Koper in 2006.

Filmography
Joshua, Oh, Joshua (2000)
Koper (2006)

Soap operas
Hati Seluas Samudra
Romi dan Yuli
Mutiara Cinta
Wah Cantiknya!!!
Wah Cantiknya!!! 2
Si Cecep
Mukjizat Allah
Cintaku Di Rumah Susun
Cinta Indah
Sulaiman
Cinta Indah 2
Indahnya Karunia-Mu
Titipan Illahi
UFO
Anugerah

References

1975 births
Living people
Indonesian male actors
People from Blitar